The Arkansas Electric Cooperative Corporation (AECC) is an electrical generation and distribution cooperative founded in 1949 and headquartered in Little Rock, Arkansas. It sells wholesale energy to 17 member cooperatives serving 500,000 customers across 62% of the land area of Arkansas.

Generation facilities

Long-term purchase agreements
Besides its owned and leased generation facilities, AECC also provides energy through long-term purchase agreements, including:
 a 20-year agreement to purchase 100 megawatts from the Wildhorse Mountain wind farm in Pushmataha County, Oklahoma
 an agreement with the Southwestern Power Administration expiring June 30, 2020 to purchase up to 189 megawatts from its supply of hydropower
 a 20-year agreement to purchase up to 51 megawatts from the Flat Ridge 2 wind farm in Kansas
 a 20-year agreement to be the sole recipient of energy generated at the 150-megawatt Origin wind farm in Oklahoma

Member cooperatives
Arkansas Valley Electric Cooperative
Ashley-Chicot Electric Cooperative
C&L Electric Cooperative
Carroll Electric Cooperative
Clay County Electric Cooperative
Craighead Electric Cooperative
Farmers Electric Cooperative
First Electric Cooperative
Mississippi County Electric Cooperative
North Arkansas Electric Cooperative
Ouachita Electric Cooperative Corporation
Ozarks Electric Cooperative
Petit Jean Electric Cooperative
Rich Mountain Electric Cooperative
South Central Arkansas Electric Cooperative
Southwest Arkansas Electric Cooperative
Woodruff Electric Cooperative

External links
Official website

References

Electric cooperatives in Arkansas
Companies based in Little Rock, Arkansas
1949 establishments in Arkansas